Arbutus tessellata is a Mexican species of shrubs in the heath family. It is widespread across much of northern and central Mexico from Chihuahua to Jalisco, Tlaxcala, and Veracruz. It is found in a variety of habitats including Coastal chaparral and Mixed evergreen scrub and woodland. It has a relatively low seed germination rate which is one of the reasons that it is found in scattered populations. They produce red berries and their bark peels.

References

tessellata
Flora of Mexico
Plants described in 1987